Nisporto is a village in Tuscany, central Italy, administratively a frazione of the comune of Rio, province of Livorno. At the time of the 2001 census its population was 21.

Nisporto is located on the Elba Island and it is about 8 km from Rio Marina.

References

External links 
 
 
 

Frazioni of Rio, Italy